The Stołowe Mountains (in English known as the Table Mountains) are mountain range in Poland and the Czech Republic, part of the Central Sudetes. The Polish part of the range is protected as the Stołowe Mountains National Park. The highest peak of the range is Szczeliniec Wielki at  a.s.l.

Geomorphology
The range is formed of sandstone and, as the only one in Poland, presents plated structure with sheer mountain ledges. Among the tourist attractions there are two massifs: Szczeliniec Wielki on which the labyrinth, and Skalniak on which the labyrinth Błędne Skały (Errant Rocks). There are several notable rock formations, among them Kwoka ("Hen"), Wielbłąd ("Camel"), Małpa ("Monkey"), Głowa Konia ("Horse Head"), Fotel Pradziada ("Great Grandfather's Armchair").

Film locations
Errant Rocks (Polish: Błędne Skały)
The Chronicles of Narnia: Prince Caspian 
Spellbinder

Gallery

References

External links 
 Stolowe Mountains National Park

Sudetes
Mountain ranges of Poland
Mountain ranges of the Czech Republic